Jai Jawaan Jai Kisaan is a 2015 Indian Hindi-language biographical drama film directed by Milan Ajmera. It is based on the life of former Indian Prime Minister Lal Bahadur Shastri and is titled after his popular slogan of the same name.

Synopsis

Cast
 Jatin Khurana as Chandrashekhar Azad
 Avinash Kumar as Sukhdev
 Om Puri  as Dr. Rajendra Prasad.
 Prem Chopra as Pdt. Govind Vallabh Pant
 Rati Agnihotri as Rajalaxmi Pandit
 Rishi Bhutani as Pt. Jawaharlal Nehru
 Rati Agnihotri as	Vijaya Lakshmi Pandit
 Akhilesh Jain as Lal Bahadur Shastri 
 Ajit Khare as younger Lal Bahadur Shastri
 Manoj Bhatt as youngest Lal Bahadur Shastri
 Jaiwant Patekar as Mahatma Gandhi
 Imran Hasnee as Nishkameshwar Prasad Mishra
 Mandeep Kohli as Indira Gandhi
 Neha Sharma as Lalita Shastri
 Kanchan Awasthi as Lalita's sister-in-law
 Shalini Arora as Ram Dulari Devi
 Aarti Tyagi as Lalbhadur Shashtri's aunt

Production
The film was produced by Madan Lal Khurana, Seema Chakerverty, and Pankaj Dua under the banner of Victorious Enterprises and directed by Milan Ajmera, production design by Bhupesh Salaskar and a script by Dhiraj Mishra.
Casting
Renowned theatre actor from Bhopal Akhilesh Jain was selected to essay the role of Lal Bahadur Shastri. While actors like Om Puri, Prem Chopra and Rati Agnihotri were cast in strong roles of various political leaders. Actor Jatin Khurana also features in the film as Chandrashekar Azad, Ajit Khare as Lal Bahadur Shastri (age 14 to 21 years), Manoj Bhatt as Lal Bahadur Shastri (young).

Filming
The shoot of Jai Jawaan Jai Kisaan began in April 2013 and it was filmed at various locations in Allahabad, Mumbai and Delhi.

Soundtrack

This soundtrack album has both patriotic and fun songs. The biggest highlight of the album is "Saj Ke Chali Hai Bharat Maan", sung by Javed Ali. Aman Trikha has sung "Mere Desh Ka Javaab Nahi". Rupesh and Girish are the composers of all the songs and Kishan Paliwal is the lyricist.

See also
 List of artistic depictions of Mahatma Gandhi

References

External links
 
 Jai Jawaan Jai Kisaan ar MSN
 

2015 films
2010s Hindi-language films
Memorials to Lal Bahadur Shastri
Cultural depictions of prime ministers of India
Cultural depictions of politicians
Cultural depictions of Indian men
Indian biographical drama films
Cultural depictions of Jawaharlal Nehru
Cultural depictions of Indira Gandhi
Cultural depictions of Mahatma Gandhi
Films set in the British Raj
Films set in the partition of India
Films shot in Delhi
Films shot in Mumbai
Films set in Delhi
Films set in Mumbai
Memorials to Chandra Shekhar Azad
Memorials to Rajendra Prasad